Ražňany is a village and municipality in Sabinov District in the Prešov Region of north-eastern Slovakia, approximately 2 km southwest from the district town of Sabinov and 30 km from the border of Poland. The population of Ražňany is 1,546.

History
In historical records, the village was first mentioned in 1248 as part of the manor of Šariš Castle, and was formed through the combination of the settlements of Nyar and Ardo. The present name of Ražňany was established in 1948.

Geography
The municipality lies at an altitude of 350 metres and covers an area of 11.48 km². It has a population of about 1,546 people.

Attractions
Since 1863, the famous "Narshan" cherries have been grown in the village in extensive cherry orchards. 
In communal  park occurs several hundred - year trees .
Also flying field fall under village cadaster which is nowadays operated by Aeroclub Sabinov.
In summer season Aeroclub Sabinov is regularly organizating aerial day.
like exhibition of air acrobations and jump off  of parachutists.

People of consequence

Štefan Onderčo (19.8.1884 - 31.3.1937)

- rector, canoeist and politician

External links
http://www.statistics.sk/mosmis/eng/run.html
http://www.raznany.sk/
http://www.aeroklub-sabinov.com/portal/

Villages and municipalities in Sabinov District